Saglek Bay or Saeglek Bay is a long narrow inlet or bay in Labrador.

See also
CFS Saglek
Saglek Airport

References

Bays of Newfoundland and Labrador
Fjords of Newfoundland and Labrador